"Did My Time" is a song written and recorded by American nu metal band Korn for the film, Lara Croft Tomb Raider: The Cradle of Life. It was released as a single in July 2003 in support of the film, and was later featured on the band's sixth studio album, Take a Look in the Mirror.

Music and structure
The song was based around an unfinished idea from the era of 2002's Untouchables. James "Munky" Shaffer had written the main riff and played it frequently during the sessions, but producer Michael Beinhorn did not see potential in it. In early 2003, Korn completed the whole song, and caught the attention of Paramount Pictures who wanted to use it in the film Lara Croft Tomb Raider: The Cradle of Life. However, the song was only released as a single for the film, and featured during the end credits. It did not appear on the motion picture soundtrack, due to certain clauses in Jonathan Davis's record contract at the time, the same reason why Davis could not release the original versions of the songs he composed for the Queen of the Damned soundtrack, which featured his vocals. The instrumental version of "Did My Time" was also featured on the PlayStation 2 fighting game "Fight Club" and VH1's 100 most shocking music moments in the discussion of the Woodstock 1999 riot.

Concept

Chart performance
"Did My Time" became Korn's first and only top forty entry on the Hot 100, peaking at number thirty-eight in August 2003, due to the physical sales of the CD single.

Charts

Music video
A video was directed by Dave Meyers, mainly known for his work with rapper Missy Elliott, featuring the star of Lara Croft Tomb Raider: The Cradle of Life, Angelina Jolie. The video shows Angelina Jolie walking through an alley when the ground starts to crack. A black mist rises out of the cracks, which then transforms into the band when the main riff of the song starts. The black mist around them starts becomes bigger as the song progresses. In the end of the music video, the band disappears and the cracks disappear as well. Scenes from the movie are shown during the video.

Awards
The song received a nomination at the 2004 Grammy Awards for Best Metal Performance, but lost to Metallica's "St. Anger". This would be Korn's fourth nomination in the aforementioned category and their sixth overall.

Track listing
"Did My Time" – 4:10
"Did My Time" (The Grayedout mix) – 4:47
"One" (live, Metallica cover) – 4:31
 Recorded live at MTV Icon: Metallica on May 3, 2003, written by James Hetfield and Lars Ulrich.

See also

Notes

External links

 Lyrics

2003 singles
Korn songs
Music videos directed by Dave Meyers (director)
Works based on Tomb Raider
Songs written for films
2003 songs
Epic Records singles
Songs written by Reginald Arvizu
Songs written by Jonathan Davis
Songs written by James Shaffer
Songs written by David Silveria
Songs written by Brian Welch